SS Djemnah was a French cargo-passenger ship, launched in 1875, that was sunk in the Mediterranean by the German submarine UB-105 during the First World War.

Description 
Displacing 5,400 tonnes, the ship was 125 metres long, with a beam of 12.1 metres. Her top speed was 14 knots. The ship could carry 1385 passengers (83 in First Class, 42 in Second, 60 in Third and 1,200 below decks).

History
The Djemnah was built in La Ciotat in 1875 for the shipping company Messageries Maritimes. The ship was used as a line ship to the Far East and to the Southern Indian Ocean.

On 4 November 1878, Djemnah was driven ashore at La Joliette, Bouches-du-Rhône. She was on a voyage from Marseille to China. Her 141 passengers were taken off. She was later refloated and put back to Marseille.

On 6 July 1918, the ship left from Marseilles for Madagascar, with a crew of 153, 601 passengers and 530 tons of cargo. On 14 July the ship was 69 nautical miles north from the Libyan coast when she was torpedoed at 21.32 by the German submarine UB-105 under command of Wilhelm Marschall. The ship sank in two minutes, taking with her 436 people, including the captain. 110 survivors were picked up by the trawler Presidency and 218 by the British escort HMS Mallow.

External links 
 Technical data of the Djemnah 
 
 French Lines

References

1874 ships
Ships built in France
World War I passenger ships of France
World War I shipwrecks in the Mediterranean Sea
Maritime incidents in November 1878
Maritime incidents in 1918
Ships sunk by German submarines in World War I